Vanadevatha is a 1976 Indian Malayalam film,  directed and produced by Yusufali Kechery. The film stars Prem Nazir, Madhushala and Adoor Bhasi in the lead roles. This is remake of the Hindi movie Madhumati. The film had musical score by G. Devarajan.

Cast

Prem Nazir as Chandran/Suresh
Madhushala as Devi/Nirmala/Parimala
Adoor Bhasi as Kunju
 K. P. A. C. Azeez as Kannan
Pattom Sadan as Velu
T. S. Muthaiah as Prof Das
Anandan as Sathram Watcher
K. P. Ummer as Lohithakshan
N. Govindankutty as Thankappan

Soundtrack
The music was composed by G. Devarajan and the lyrics were written by Yusufali Kechery.

References

External links
 

1976 films
1970s Malayalam-language films
Malayalam remakes of Hindi films
Films directed by Yusufali Kechery